The 1983 Lorraine Open was a men's tennis tournament played on Indoor carpet courts. The event was part of the 1983 Volvo Grand Prix and was played in Nancy in France. It was the fifth edition of the tournament and took place from 7 March through 13 March 1983. Unseeded Nick Saviano won the singles title.

Finals

Singles

 Nick Saviano defeated  Chip Hooper  6–4, 4–6, 6-3
 It was Saviano's only singles title of his career.

Doubles

 Jan Gunnarsson /  Anders Järryd defeated  Ricardo Acuña /  Belus Prajoux 7–5, 6–3

References

External links
 ITF tournament draw sheet

Lorraine Open
Lorraine Open
Lorraine Open
Lorraine Open